During the 1997–98 English football season, Notts County F.C. competed in the Football League Third Division.

Season summary
In the 1997–98 season Notts County secured promotion in March and finished top of the division.

Final league table

 Pld = Matches ; W = Matches won; D = Matches drawn; L = Matches lost; F = Goals for; A = Goals against; GD = Goal difference; Pts = Points
 NB: In the Football League goals scored (F) takes precedence over goal difference (GD).

Results
Notts County's score comes first.

Legend

Football League Second Division

FA Cup

League Cup

Football League Trophy

Squad

References

Notts County F.C. seasons
Notts County